Lev Abramovich Borodulin (25 January 1923, Moscow – 21 December 2018, Tel Aviv) was a Russian and Israeli photographer, master of sports photography.

Biography 
Between 1940 and 1941 he studied at the art department of Moscow State University of Printing Arts, which ended only after the war. Participated in the Great Patriotic War, awarded medals For the Defence of Moscow and For the Capture of Berlin, he is injured.

Photography became engaged after graduation. The first publication took place in 1947 in the student newspaper. In 1950–1960 he worked as a photographer for the magazine Ogoniok. The first photographer in the Soviet Union, apply effects Fisheye lens.

Photography Year Book in 1964 recognizes Leo Borodulin star of world photography. In 1967, a Japanese newspaper Asahi Shimbun the best photographer of the year. In 1971 in Munich Lev Borodulin has been awarded for achievements in the field of sports photography Olympic gold medal.

In 1972, he moved to Israel and lived in Tel Aviv. In Israel, Lev Borodulin continued work of the photographer.

Collecting valuable pictures colleagues work. He died on 21 December 2018.

References

External links
 Лев Бородулин: судьба фотографа как отражение истории
 Лев Бородулин. Раритеты фотохроники СССР. 1917–1991.

1923 births
2018 deaths
Soviet photographers
Israeli photographers
Russian photographers
Soviet Jews
Russian Jews
Russian emigrants to Israel